The Kyrgyz ambassador in Washington, D. C. is the official representative of the Government in Bishkek to the Government of the United States.

List of representatives

References 

 
United States
Kyrgyzstan

See also
Embassy of the Kyrgyz Republic to the USA and Canada